Calpionellites is an extinct genus of single celled eukaryotes. Their fossils are found in rocks dating to the Valanginian stage of the Early Cretaceous.

Biostratigraphic significance 
The first occurrence of the species Calpionellites darderi marks the beginning of the Valanginian and thus end of the Berriasian.

Distribution 
Fossils of the genus have been found in:
 Puke, Albania
 Steinmühl Formation, Austria
 Guasasa Formation, Cuba
 Lake Rożnów, Poland
 Lapos Formation, Romania
 Miravetes and Tollo Formations, Spain

See also 
 Calpionella

References 

Alveolata genera
Prehistoric SAR supergroup genera
Index fossils
Early Cretaceous first appearances
 
Early Cretaceous extinctions
Fossils of Albania
Cretaceous Austria
Fossils of Austria
Cretaceous Cuba
Fossils of Cuba
Fossils of Poland
Cretaceous Romania
Fossils of Romania
Cretaceous Spain
Fossils of Spain